{{Infobox television station
| callsign               = KTFO-CD
| above                  = Translator of KAKW-DT,Killeen–Austin, Texas
| city                   =
| logo                   = 
| branding               = UniMás Austin
| digital                = 36 (UHF)
| virtual                = 31
| subchannels            = 
| translators            = KAKW-DT 62.2 (13.2 VHF) Killeen
| affiliations           = 31.1: UniMás31.2: Univision31.3: getTV31.4: Ion Mystery31.5: Dabl| owner                  = TelevisaUnivision
| licensee               = KAKW License Partnership, L.P.
| location               = Austin, Texas
| country                = United States
| airdate                = 
| last_airdate           = 
| callsign_meaning       = Telefutura
| sister_stations        = KAKW-DT, KXLK-CD
| former_callsigns       = K30CE (1988–2001)K31FM (2001–2002)KDAS-CA (2002–2005)KAKW-CA (2005–2007)KTFO-CA (2007–2010)
| former_channel_numbers = Analog:30 (UHF, 1988–2001)31 (UHF, 2001–2010)
| former_affiliations    = Univision (1988–2009)
| erp                    = 15 kW
| haat                   = 
| class                  = CD
| facility_id            = 35882
| coordinates            = 
| licensing_authority    = FCC
| website                =  
}}KTFO-CD (channel 31) is a low-power, Class A television station licensed to Austin, Texas, United States, broadcasting the Spanish-language UniMás network. It is owned and operated by TelevisaUnivision alongside Killeen-licensed Univision outlet KAKW-DT (channel 62). Both stations share studios on North Loop Boulevard in Austin, while KTFO-CD's transmitter is located at the West Austin Antenna Farm north of West Lake Hills.

Although KTFO-CD identifies as a separate station in its own right, it is officially licensed as a translator of KAKW-DT. In addition to its own digital signal, KTFO-CD is simulcast in high definition on KAKW-DT's second digital subchannel (virtual channel 62.2, VHF channel 13.2) from a transmitter in unincorporated Williamson County (approximately halfway between Austin and Killeen). KAKW-DT, in turn, is simulcast on KTFO-CD's second digital subchannel.

History
The station first signed on the air on March 28, 1988 as K30CE, broadcasting on UHF channel 30. In 2001, the station changed its call letters to K31FM, and relocated to channel 31. In 2002, the station's calls changed again to KDAS-CA, and became a repeater of KAKW-TV in Killeen, after that station switched its affiliation to Univision. It later changed its call letters to KAKW-CA in 2005, and then to KTFO-CA in 2007. In 2009, the station was relaunched with as a separate outlet from KAKW and affiliated with Telefutura (now UniMás). In 2010, the station converted to a digital signal and modified its callsign to KTFO-CD'''.

Technical information

Subchannels
The station's digital signal is multiplexed:

References

External links 

UniMás network affiliates
GetTV affiliates
Ion Mystery affiliates
Dabl affiliates
Television channels and stations established in 1988
TFO-CD
TFO-CD
Low-power television stations in the United States
1988 establishments in Texas